East Africa team may refer to one of the following sport teams in the region:

 East and Central Africa cricket team (1989–2003)
 East Africa cricket team (1966–1989)
 East Africa rugby union team

Sport in East Africa